The 2015 Japanese motorcycle Grand Prix was the fifteenth round of the 2015 Grand Prix motorcycle racing season, consisting of the MotoGP, Moto2 and Moto3 classes. It was held at the Twin Ring Motegi in Motegi on 11 October 2015.

In the premier class, the race began in damp conditions but dried out over the course of the race. Jorge Lorenzo had started on pole but faded to third with tyre issues, and it was Dani Pedrosa that achieved his first victory since the 2014 Czech Republic Grand Prix, and as a result, became the eighth rider to record 50 victories at World Championship level. Valentino Rossi extended his championship lead to eighteen with a second-place finish, ahead of Lorenzo.

During free practice, Alex de Angelis crashed heavily and was taken to hospital in a critical but stable condition. De Angelis missed the remainder of the season as a result of the crash.

Zarco went on to win the shortened race ahead of German duo Jonas Folger and Sandro Cortese. In the Moto3 race also shortened by weather delays, Niccolò Antonelli took his second win of the season ahead of Miguel Oliveira and Jorge Navarro, while championship leader Danny Kent maintained his points lead with sixth place.

Classification

MotoGP

Moto2
Due to weather conditions which caused delays in the schedule, the race distance was reduced from 23 to 15 laps.

Moto3
Due to weather conditions which caused delays in the schedule, the race distance was reduced from 20 to 13 laps.

Championship standings after the race (MotoGP)
Below are the standings for the top five riders and constructors after round fifteen has concluded.

Riders' Championship standings

Constructors' Championship standings

Teams' Championship standings

 Note: Only the top five positions are included for both sets of standings.

References

Japanese
Motorcycle Grand Prix
Japanese motorcycle Grand Prix
Japanese motorcycle Grand Prix